The 2014–15 NBB Cup was the 47th season of the annual cup tournament in the Netherlands. Donar was the defending champion.

The Final was played in the Landstede Sportcentrum in Zwolle on 29 March 2015. Donar defeated SPM Shoeters Den Bosch 70–78 in the championship game.

Format
In the first, second and third round teams from the Dutch second, third and fourth division participate. From the fourth round, teams from the Dutch Basketball League (DBL) enter the competition. Quarter- and semi-finals are played in a two-legged format. When a team form a tier lower than the DBL played a DBL team, one win is sufficient for the latter to advance to the next round.

Bracket

Fourth round

|}

Quarterfinals

|}

Semifinals

|}

Final

Notes

References

NBB Cup
NBB Cup